Francesca Stuart Sindici (1858 – c. 1929) was a Spanish-Italian painter.

Sindici was born in Madrid in 1858 and became a pupil of Eduardo Dalbono and Domenico Morelli at the Naples Academy of Fine Arts. She married the Italian poet Augusto Sindici. Together they had a daughter, Magda, who became a novelist and later married a publisher. She died in 1929 at the age of 71.

Sindici is best known for her paintings of horses and cavalry. Her painting A Carriage Race at Naples was included in the 1905 book Women Painters of the World.

References

External links
 
 Francesca Sindici on artnet
 Spedizione di Roma 1870, il passaggio del Tevere, 1870 painting in the Museo centrale del Risorgimento, Rome

1858 births
1920s deaths
Artists from Madrid
19th-century Italian painters
20th-century Italian painters
Italian women painters
19th-century Spanish painters
20th-century Spanish painters
19th-century Spanish women artists
20th-century Spanish women artists
Accademia di Belle Arti di Napoli alumni
20th-century Italian women